The Damara threadsnake (Namibiana labialis) is a species of snake in the family Leptotyphlopidae. It is found in northwestern Namibia and southern Angola.

References

Namibiana
Snakes of Africa
Reptiles of Angola
Reptiles of Namibia
Taxa named by Richard Sternfeld
Reptiles described in 1908